Vinicius Geovane Damasceno de Paula (born 29 March 1998) is a Brazilian footballer.

References 

1998 births
Living people
Brazilian footballers
Brazilian expatriate footballers
Association football forwards
Orange County SC players
USL Championship players